Drunkard's Prayer is the eighth studio album by Over the Rhine, released in 2005. It is a concept album telling the story of band members Linford Detweiler and Karin Bergquist's marriage, near-divorce and reconciliation.

Track listing
All songs written by Karin Bergquist and Linford Detweiler, except My Funny Valentine, written by Richard Rodgers and Lorenz Hart.

"I Want You To Be My Love" - 4:09
"Born" - 6:13
"Drunkard's Prayer" - 4:10
"Bluer" - 3:45
"Spark" - 4:13
"Hush Now (Stella's Tarantella)" - 3:22
"Lookin' Forward" - 3:15
"Little Did I Know" - 6:55
"Who Will Guard The Door" - 5:06
"Firefly" - 5:22
"My Funny Valentine" - 4:16

Personnel
Karin Bergquist - vocals, acoustic guitar, piano on "Drunkard's Prayer" and "Firefly"
Linford Detweiler - piano, acoustic guitar, wurli, bass, percussion, backing vocals on "Bluer"

Additional personnel
Byron House - upright bass
Pete Hicks - electric guitar on "Born" and "Firefly"
David Henry - cello
Brent Gallaher - saxophone
Devon Ashley - drums

References

Over the Rhine (band) albums
2005 albums
Concept albums
Back Porch Records albums